Měník is a municipality and village in Hradec Králové District in the Hradec Králové Region of the Czech Republic. It has about 600 inhabitants.

Administrative parts
Villages of Barchůvek, Bydžovská Lhotka and Libeň are administrative parts of Měník.

References

External links

Villages in Hradec Králové District